Danilo Bertazzi (born 23 February 1960 in Chivasso, Piedmont) is an Italian character actor, voice-over artist, presenter and entertainer perhaps best known for his role in the television program Melevisione on Raitre (as Tonio Cartonio) from 1999 to 2004 and his roles in Trebisonda (as Danilo) from 2006.

References

External links
 Danilo Bertazzi in AppleTV

1960 births
Living people
People from Chivasso
Italian male film actors
Italian stand-up comedians
Italian male television actors
Italian television personalities